Melanonotus powellorum is a species of katydid in the subfamily Pseudophyllinae. It was described in 1975 from Monteverde, Costa Rica.

Description 
Malanonotus powellorum is yellowish brown, with a large, rounded head and long antennae. It is sluggish, flightless, and nocturnal, emerging to feed at night among the leaves of the forest understory.

Range 
This species is known from Monteverde, where it is common, and also elsewhere in Costa Rica.

Habitat

Ecology

Etymology 
The specific epithet honors George and Harriett Powell, researchers who helped establish the Monteverde Cloud Forest Reserve and preserve the habitat of this species.

Taxonomy

References 

Pseudophyllinae
Insects described in 1975
Endemic fauna of Costa Rica
Insects of Central America